Substituted tryptamines, or serotonin analogues, are organic compounds which may be thought of as being derived from tryptamine itself. The molecular structures of all tryptamines contain an indole ring, joined to an amino (NH2) group via an ethyl (−CH2–CH2−) sidechain. In substituted tryptamines, the indole ring, sidechain, and/or amino group are modified by substituting another group for one of the hydrogen (H) atoms.

Well-known tryptamines include serotonin, an important neurotransmitter, and melatonin, a hormone involved in regulating the sleep-wake cycle. Tryptamine alkaloids are found in fungi, plants and animals; and sometimes used by humans for the neurological or psychotropic effects of the substance. Prominent examples of tryptamine alkaloids include psilocybin (from "psilocybin mushrooms") and DMT. In South America, dimethyltryptamine is obtained from numerous plant sources, like chacruna, and it is often used in ayahuasca brews. Many synthetic tryptamines have also been made, including the migraine drug sumatriptan, and psychedelic drugs. A 2022 study has found the variety of tryptamines present in wild mushrooms may affect the therapeutic impact.

The tryptamine structure, in particular its indole ring, may be part of the structure of some more complex compounds, for example: LSD, ibogaine, mitragynine and yohimbine. A thorough investigation of dozens of tryptamine compounds was published by Ann and Alexander Shulgin under the title TiHKAL.

List of substituted tryptamines

List of substituted α-alkyltryptamines
α-Alkyltryptamines are a group of substituted tryptamines which possess an alkyl group, such as a methyl or ethyl group, attached at the alpha carbon, and in most cases no substitution on the amine nitrogen. α-Alkylation of tryptamine makes it much more metabolically stable and resistant to degradation by monoamine oxidase, resulting in increased potency and greatly lengthened half-life. This is analogous to α-methylation of phenethylamine into amphetamine.

Many α-alkyltryptamines are drugs, acting as monoamine releasing agents, non-selective serotonin receptor agonists, and/or monoamine oxidase inhibitors, and produce psychostimulant, entactogen, and/or psychedelic effects. The most well-known of these agents are α-methyltryptamine (αMT) and α-ethyltryptamine (αET), both of which were used clinically as antidepressants for a brief period of time in the past and are abused as recreational drugs. In accordance with its action as a dual releasing agent of serotonin and dopamine, αET has been found to produce serotonergic neurotoxicity similarly to amphetamines like MDMA and PCA, and the same is also likely to hold true for other serotonin and dopamine-releasing α-alkyltryptamines such as αMT, 5-MeO-αMT, and various others.

Related compounds
A number of related compounds are known, with a similar structure but having the indole core flipped and/or replaced with related cores such as indoline, indazole, benzothiophene, or benzofuran. These similarly are primarily active as agonists at the 5-HT2 family of serotonin receptors, with applications in the treatment of glaucoma, cluster headaches or as anorectics.

Further reading
 TiHKAL

See also
 Ergoline
 Lysergamide
 Iboga alkaloid
 Substituted amphetamine
 Substituted benzofuran
 Substituted cathinone
 Substituted methylenedioxyphenethylamine
 Substituted phenethylamine
 2C, DOx, 25-NB

References

Tryptamines
Functional groups